The 2010 Seniors Torneo Godó was the fifth edition of the Seniors Torneo Godó and it took place from April 16–18, 2010.

Tie-breaks were used for the first two sets of each match, which was the best of three sets. If the score was tied at one set all, a "champions tie break" (the first player to win at least 10 points or by a margin of two points) would be used.

Félix Mantilla was the defending champion, but did not compete this year.

Goran Ivanišević won the title by defeating Thomas Enqvist 6–4, 6–4 in the final. Joan Balcells took the third place.

Draw
The main draw was announced on 24 March. The order of play was revealed in early April.
  Joan Balcells
  Sergi Bruguera
  Thomas Enqvist
  Wayne Ferreira
  Goran Ivanišević
  Mikael Pernfors

Group stage

Group A

Group B

Final four

Third-place playoff

Final

References

External links

Barcelona Open (tennis)
Torneo Godo, Seniors
Godo